The 2011–12 Baylor Bears basketball team  represented Baylor University in the 2011–12 NCAA Division I men's basketball season.  The team finished 30–7 overall and 12–6 in Big 12 Conference play to finish in a third-place tie with Iowa State. In postseason play, Baylor lost to Missouri in the 2012 Big 12 men's basketball tournament championship game and Kentucky in the Elite Eight of the 2012 NCAA Division I men's basketball tournament.

Preseason
From August 12 to 15, the Baylor Bears participated in the Canadian Foreign Tour which began their preseason, going 3-1 during the tour. The Bears concluded their preseason against Abilene Christian University. The Bears began regular season play ranked 12th in both the AP and USA Today Coaches Preseason polls.

Coaching
Scott Drew coached for in both conference wins (12) and wins overall (30). It was his ninth season as head coach.

NCAA tournament
In the 2011-12 season, Baylor had one of its best seasons since 2008-09, going 27-7, with their highest ranking being #3. They also won the Continental Tires Las Vegas Classic, which made them a #3 seed in the South region of the NCAA Tournament.

In Baylor's second-round game of the tournament, Bears sophomore Brady Heslip hit nine 3-pointers on the way to a new career high of 27 points. He helped the Bears win against the 11th seed University of Colorado, which earned them a spot in the Sweet 16 to face Xavier University.

In the Sweet 16 game vs Xavier University, Baylor had a 20-4 lead, with the lead shortening to 7 at the half. The paint game of the Baylor Bears in the second and third rounds was upped against Xavier. Quincy Acy's dunks and paint game helped the Baylor bears throughout the game. Quincy Acy finished with 20 points and 15 rebounds. Point guard Pierre Jackson added 15 and Perry Jones III had 14 points. Burlington, Ontario's Brady Heslip scored 4 free throws in the last minute.

On Sunday, March 25, 2012, the Baylor Bears played The University of Kentucky in an Elite 8 match up for a spot in to The Final Four in New Orleans. Kentucky led by 20 points going into half time. Kentucky absorbed a 9-1 Baylor run midway through the second half and got back to playing their up-tempo game, leading them to the 82-70 victory over the Bears. The Bears' season ended in this Elite 8 match-up.

"Kentucky is the most athletic team in the country; they forced us into turnovers and tough shots. They converted in transition and really showed their athleticism and sped the game up. They defended well too." Quote from Brady Heslip.

One of Baylor's four senior's, Quincy Acy, had an outstanding year as a Small Forward throughout the season. He scored double-digits in multiple games, including a career high in blocks with 6 in a game. Acy was named the Big 12 "Best Athlete" by Sporting News. Quincy will be graduating this year (2012) and is an eligible prospect for the upcoming NBA draft. While Baylor will be losing a strong player, they have a number of juniors and sophomores with the talent and ability to step up into a leadership role for the 2012-13 season.

Roster
Source

 Gary Franklin, who transferred from California after the 2010 fall semester, became eligible to play for Baylor in the 2012 spring semester.
 Logan Lowery transferred from Centenary after the 2010–11 season. Because Centenary had reclassified to the non-scholarship Division III, Lowery was allowed to immediately play without sitting out a transfer year, but chose to redshirt instead.

Rankings

On December 5, Baylor moved into sixth in the AP Poll and seventh in the Coaches Poll, achieving the highest ranking in school history.

Schedule and results
Source
All times are Central

|-
!colspan=9| Exhibition

|-
!colspan=9| Regular Season

 

 

|-
!colspan=9| Big 12 Regular Season

    

|-
! colspan=9|2012 Big 12 men's basketball tournament

|-
!colspan=9| 2012 NCAA tournament

References

"Scott Drew Profile - Baylor Bears Official Athletic Site - BaylorBears.com ." Baylor Bears Official Athletic Site - BaylorBears.com. N.p., n.d. Web. 24 Mar. 2012. http://www.baylorbears.com/sports/m-baskbl/mtt/drew_scott00.html
Quincy Acy Profile - Baylor Bears Official Athletic Site - BaylorBears.com . (n.d.). Baylor Bears Official Athletic Site - BaylorBears.com. Retrieved March 28, 2012, from https://web.archive.org/web/20190915113708/https://baylorbears.com/roster.aspx?rp_id=575
Wolstat, R. (2012, March 24). IT’S BAYLOR, BABY! Bears start quick, then hold off relentless Xavier squad to advance to Elite 8. The Saturday Sun, pp. 16.
Barr, J. (2012, March, 18). Baylor vs. Colorado: Brady Heslip shoots Bears into Sweet 16. The Washington post, Retrieved from https://www.washingtonpost.com/blogs/early-lead/post/baylor-vs-colorado-brady-heslip-shoots-bears-into-sweet-16/2012/03/17/gIQAl6uiJS_blog.html
Newberry, P. (2012, March 26). Kentucky beats Baylor 82-70 in South Regional. Associated Press. Retrieved from https://www.google.com/hostednews/ap/article/ALeqM5gWL0a5PWvNpaEkjrHknKNjC8NGIA?docId=902283ac6887478496f86438ddc0048e

Baylor
Baylor Bears men's basketball seasons
Baylor